Reijerscop is a hamlet in the Dutch province of Utrecht. It is a part of the municipality of Woerden, and lies about 12 km west of Utrecht.

The hamlet was first mentioned in 1217 as Reynerscoep, and means "concession of Reyner (person)". Reijerscop has unofficial place name signs. In 1840, it was home to 31 people.

References

Populated places in Utrecht (province)
Woerden